Chip Talk is a radio show syndicated by the Associated Press Radio Network. Launched in the early 1980s, it is the longest-running computer-related broadcast program on the air. It was written and hosted by Seattle radio personality Dave Ross, who had produced the program since its inception, until mid-2004, when he took a leave of absence to run for the United States Congress. Kevin Ebi was substitute host during the campaign; Ross resumed his place as host following his unsuccessful campaign run. Chip Talk is produced at Seattle's KIRO (AM) radio.

External links
 Chip Talk Home page with archives

American radio programs